

Pakri Lighthouse (Estonian: Pakri tuletorn) is a lighthouse located on the Pakri Peninsula (on the coast of the Baltic Sea), Harju County, in Estonia.

History 
The first known lighthouse to be built on the Pakri Peninsula was in 1724. The location of the lighthouse was allegedly picked by Tsar Peter the Great. In the year of 1889, the current lighthouse, made out of limestone, was built 80 metres away from the old one. The Pakri old lighthouse was partially demolished, and used as a paraffin store. The lighthouse and lighthouse keeper's house were severely damaged during World War II; however, these structures have survived, and in 2001 the lighthouse was fully renovated.

See also 

 List of lighthouses in Estonia

References

External links 

 

Lighthouses completed in 1889
Resort architecture in Estonia
Lighthouses in Estonia
Buildings and structures in Harju County
Tourist attractions in Harju County